Monroe Righter Owsley (August 11, 1900 – June 7, 1937) was an American stage and film actor.

Early years
The son of Mr. and Mrs. Henry Owsley, he was born in Atlanta, Georgia. His father was a manufacturing executive, and his mother was a concert singer. Owsley was educated at Loomis Institute in Windsor, Connecticut; Bristol High School in Bristol, Connecticut; and Philadelphia High School. He started taking acting classes when he was a teenager.

Before Owsley became an actor, he worked as a reporter and a drama critic for the Public Ledger newspaper in Philadelphia, Pennsylvania.

Career 
Owsley gained acting experience with stock theater troupes in Chicago, Cincinnati, and Dayton, and in a road company that presented The Meanest Man in the World in a tent in one-night stands. He made his Broadway debut in Young Blood (1925). His film debut was 1928's The First Kiss, starring Fay Wray. This was followed by the Philip Barry film Holiday in 1930, in the role played by Lew Ayres in the 1938 version. Soon after, he was cast opposite actresses such as Clara Bow, Bette Davis, Barbara Stanwyck, Joan Crawford, Gloria Swanson, Mae West, and Kay Francis.

Death
On June 7, 1937, Owsley died from a heart attack in Belmont, California. He was 36 years old.

Filmography

References

External links

1900 births
1937 deaths
American male stage actors
American male film actors
Vaudeville performers
Male actors from Atlanta
Burials at Forest Lawn Memorial Park (Glendale)
20th-century American male actors
20th-century American singers